Renato "Sonny" Levi  (3 September 1926 – 12 November 2016) was an English boat designer known for creating powerboats for the Aga Khan, the Shah of Iran, and Richard Branson.

Early life
Renato Levi was born in Karachi on 3 September 1926 into a family that had fled fascism in Italy, but he was educated in France and at Darjeeling in India.

Career
Levi learned about boat design in his uncle's boat-design business Afco in Bombay. He moved to England in 1944 and became a pilot in Spitfires with the Royal Air Force. After demobilisation he founded his own boatyard in Anzio in 1960. He invented a surface propulsion system which increased speed and reduced drag and was installed on Richard Branson's Virgin Atlantic Challenger II. In 1986 he was appointed a Royal Designer for Industry.

Books 
Levi wrote and published two books about high speed design on water, Dhows To Deltas and Milestones In My Design.

Awards 
In 1987, Levi had his achievements recognised with his election as a Royal Designer for Industry, a distinction regarded as the highest honour obtainable in the field of design.

In September 2016, he was awarded with an honorary degree in boat design by the University of Genoa.

Death
Levi died on 12 November 2016.

References

External links

 “Sonny” Renato Levi (AltoMareBlu.com)

1926 births
2016 deaths
People from Karachi
Royal Air Force personnel of World War II
British marine engineers
English people of Italian descent